The Ghosts of Hanley House is a 1968 American horror film written and directed by Louise Sherrill.

Plot

A young man accepts a bet to stay in a house, with some friends, where several murders occurred. But the house may be haunted, or the original murderer may still be around.

Cast
 Elsie Baker as Lucy
 Barbara Chase as Sheila
 Roberta Reeves as Gabby

Release

Home media
The film was released for the first time on DVD by Alpha Video on March 23, 2004.

Critical response

The Ghosts of Hanley House was not reviewed by mainstream critics. Reviews that exist of the film have been mostly negative.

On his website Fantastic Movie Musings and Ramblings, Dave Sindelar criticized the film's acting and direction as abysmal, and also criticized the inconsistent sound and lighting, as well as the slow pacing. Wes R. from Oh, the Horror! called the film "extremely bland", also writing, "A film like this would have been understandable in the 50s, but by 1968, you’d think that the filmmakers could’ve at least tried a little bit harder to make a halfway interesting and watchable film." Steve Langton from The Spinning Image gave the film 1/10 stars, writing, "Louise Sherrill’s ‘regional’ horror film is so inept it turns Edward D. Wood Jr into Stanley Kubrick. The acting, photography and lighting are wretched in the extreme, with talking heads gazing uneasily past the camera, uttering inane lines of dialogue while the plot lurches from the sublime to the painfully ridiculous, using visual references to The Haunting in search of any vestige of credibility."

References

External links
 
 
 

1968 films
1968 horror films
American black-and-white films
American ghost films
American supernatural horror films
1960s supernatural horror films
Films shot in California
1960s English-language films
1960s American films